Mobile may refer to:

Places
 Mobile, Alabama, a U.S. port city
 Mobile County, Alabama
 Mobile, Arizona, a small town near Phoenix, U.S.
 Mobile, Newfoundland and Labrador

Arts, entertainment, and media

Music

Groups and labels
 Mobile (band), a Canadian rock band
 Mobiles (band), a 1980s British band

Other uses in music
 Mobile (album), a 1999 album by Brazilian Paulinho Moska
 "Mobile" (song), a 2003 song by Avril Lavigne from Let Go
 "Mobile", a song by Gentle Giant from the album Free Hand

Other uses in arts, entertainment, and media
 Mobile (sculpture), a kinetic sculpture constructed to take advantage of the principle of equilibrium
 Mobile (TV series), a British ITV drama
 "Mobile", a short story by J. G. Ballard, later renamed "Venus Smiles"
 Mobile, a feature of the game GunBound
 Mobile Magazine, a publication on portable electronics

Military and law enforcement
 Garde Mobile, historic French military unit
 Mobile Brigade Corps (Brimob), the special police force of Indonesia
 Mobile forces, especially:
 Motorized infantry 
Mounted infantry
 Operation Mobile, Canadian Forces operations in the 2011 military intervention in Libya

Science
 Motility
 Motion (physics), the ability to move or be moved

Technology
 Mobile computing, a generic term describing one's ability to use technology in mobile environments
 Mobile device, such as a smartphone, tablet, or computer designed for mobile computing
 Mobile game, a video game played on a mobile phone, smartphone, PDA or handheld computer
 Mobile network operator, a company which provides mobile phone network access and services
 Mobile operating system, the various underlying systems to power and run phones
 Mobile phone, a portable telephone that can make and receive calls
 Mobile radio, wireless communications systems and devices which are based on radio frequencies
 Mobile rig
 Mobile station, user equipment and software needed for communication with a wireless telephone network
 Mobile Web, the World Wide Web as accessed from mobile devices using Mobile Web Browser
 Mobile TV, TV services viewed via a mobile device

See also
 Mabila, a Native American people of Alabama
 Mauvilla (disambiguation)
 Mavilla (disambiguation)
 Mobil, a major oil company
Mobile station (disambiguation)
 Mobility (disambiguation)